The 2010 Rally d'Italia Sardegna was the seventh Rally d'Italia Sardegna and the fifth round of the 2010 Intercontinental Rally Challenge and also counted towards the Italian Gravel Rally Trophy. The rally was held together with the Rally del Corallo, the Italian round of the FIA European Historic Rally Championship with the cars running after the main rally. The event was held between 4–6 June 2010.
Four of the stages were broadcast live on Eurosport.

Introduction
The rally was due to start on Friday 4 June 2010 with a single special stage in Cagliari, Sardinia, but this was cancelled. Sunday saw a further  daylight gravel stages with the finish in Porto Cervo.

The leading four drivers in the championship standing were all confirmed for the event and in addition to this the Italian champion Paolo Andreucci and WRC star Sébastien Ogier also took part.

Results 

Championship leader Juho Hänninen won his second rally of the season, as he extended his championship lead over Jan Kopecký to eleven points. Defending series champion Kris Meeke and Guy Wilks, two of Hänninen's other title rivals both crashed out of the event. Wilks suffering fractured vertebrae in his crash on stage 2 and Meeke's crash, on stage 9, was caught live on television. Sébastien Ogier was also a victim of the hard stages, suffering a puncture on Stage 2 before retiring on the same stage with engine problems.

Overall

Special stages

References

External links 
 The official website for the rally
 The official website of the Intercontinental Rally Challenge

Italy
Rally d'Italia Sardegna
Rally Italia Sardegna